Ghudani Khurd is a small village near Khanna, Punjab, in India. It comes under Tehsil Payal Dist. Ludhiana. The mother of Jagmeet Singh, leader of New Democratic Party Canada, is from here.

Nearby villages 
Below is the list of nearest villages:

References

  
Villages in Ludhiana district